Bobby Riggs defeated Francis Kovacs 8–6, 7–5, 3–6, 4–6, 6–2 in the final to win the men's singles tennis title at the 1941 U.S. National Championships.

Seeds
The tournament used two lists of players for seeding the men's singles event; one for U.S. players and one for foreign players. Bobby Riggs is the champion; others show the round in which they were eliminated.

U.S.
  Bobby Riggs (champion)
  Francis Kovacs (finalist)
  Donald McNeill (semifinals)
  Ted Schroeder (semifinals)
  Frank Parker (quarterfinals)
  Wayne Sabin (quarterfinals)
  Jack Kramer (quarterfinals)
  Gardnar Mulloy (third round)

Foreign
  Ladislav Hecht (third round)
  Pancho Segura (second round)
  George Lyttleton-Rogers (second round)
  Choy Wai-Chuen (first round)

Draw

Key
 Q = Qualifier
 WC = Wild card
 LL = Lucky loser
 r = Retired

Final eight

Earlier rounds

Section 1

Section 2

Section 3

Section 4

References

External links
 1941 U.S. National Championships on ITFtennis.com, the source for this draw

Men's Singles
1941